World Tour of Scotland is a six-part television series – the first of Billy Connolly's "world tours" – originally broadcast by the BBC in July and August 1994. It involves his touring around his homeland for 54 nights during early 1994, beginning in Greenock and visiting cities and towns and performing live on stage to audiences. However, this, like all his other tours, involves more than just shows: he visits numerous places of historic and scenic value, as well as some places that resonate with his own upbringing.

The series is dedicated "with much love and thanks to the people of Scotland". It has since been released on VHS and DVD. On the latter format, the six episodes are split across two discs.

The series is often repeated on the UKTV channels Dave and Blighty.

Opening and closing titles
The opening titles feature an aerial view of the Range Rover (driven by Connolly throughout the series) making its way through various locations and weathers. The camera is mounted atop four metal legs, several feet in length.

The closing titles feature an excerpt of Connolly's performing his cover of Van Morrison's "Irish Heartbeat", live at Edinburgh's Usher Hall, over landscape views of the areas visited in the respective episodes.

Episode guide

Episode 1
The series begins with Connolly aboard a Caledonian MacBrayne ferry sailing down the west coast.

Isle of Arran. As Connolly drives off the ferry, his best friend, Danny Kyle, is shown to be in the passenger seat
Brodick Village Hall (concert venue)
Connolly is shown playing the banjo with his Isle of Arran-based friends
Glasgow
Dover Street, the street on which Connolly was born
Provand's Lordship
The tenement building, on Stewartville Street in Partick, where Connolly lived between the ages of fourteen and twenty
Glasgow Cross
Necropolis
King's Theatre (concert venue)
Auchengillan Scout Camp (which Connolly, in Pack 141, visited as a Cub Scout)
Loch Lomond

Episode 2

Partick and Govan
Stirling (including the MacRobert Centre concert venue) and Bannockburn
 Kirkcaldy and Forfar (concert venue) 
Scone Palace
Forth Bridge, Forth Road Bridge, and South Queensferry

Episode 3

Blair Atholl (Connolly stays at Blair Castle)
Highlands (Loch Garry, near Drumochter, where he skites stones on the ice; also passes Dalwhinnie, Laggan and Findhorn Bridge in Tomatin)
Inverness (concert venue at Eden Court, fishing on the River Ness and views of Loch Ness)
Culloden Moor

Episode 4

Ulbster, Caithness
Wick
Ackergill Tower, Caithness
Ring of Brogar (referred to by Connolly as the Standing Stones of Brogar)
Kirkwall
Scapa Flow (to which he travels on the fishing boat Triton)
Lerwick, Shetland (including two performances in the same night at the Garrison Theatre; the latter takes him into the next day)

Episode 5
Arbroath (where he samples a smokie and revisits the location at which he lost his virginity)
Dundee (including footage from his performance at Caird Hall)
Dundee Law (Connolly gives a straight reading of William McGonagall's poem The Tay Bridge Disaster within sight of the Tay Rail Bridge. During the course of filming, a blizzard happens, and about two inches of snow falls)
Scottish Borders, Kelso (including footage from his performance at Tait Hall)

Connolly almost ventures into English territory at the end of the episode when he cycles past the "Scotland" sign in Roxburgh. "I've come a bit far here, I believe," he says, after screeching his bike to a halt. "And me out without my passport. It is a Scottish tour, after all."

"One thing confuses me, however," he continued, as he prepares to retrace his route. "If this is the border with England, and that is the border with Scotland, what happens in here? Maybe it is owned by the Manx government, or something. I don't know. Perhaps you can build a house here and never pay tax again."

Episode 6
Edinburgh
Edinburgh Castle (including the firing of the one o'clock gun)
Court of Session
St. Giles' Cathedral
Mary King's Close (Annie's room)
Usher Hall (concert venue, from where Connolly gives a pre-show piece to camera)

Music
The music featured in the series is available on Connolly's 1995 album Musical Tour of Scotland.

Notes and references

External links

Scottish television shows
BBC television documentaries
Comedy tours
1994 Scottish television series debuts
1994 Scottish television series endings
1990s Scottish television series
Billy Connolly
English-language television shows
Television shows set in Scotland